Brandon Washington (born August 13, 1988) is a former American football offensive tackle and current coach. He has played for the Toronto Argonauts and Hamilton Tiger-Cats of the Canadian Football League (CFL), the St. Louis Rams and Philadelphia Eagles of the National Football League (NFL). Brandon was selected in the sixth round of the 2012 NFL Draft.  He played college football at the University of Miami.

College career
At the University of Miami, Washington was an All-ACC selection as a sophomore in 2010.

On December 16, 2011, Washington announced that he would forgo his senior season and enter the 2012 NFL Draft.

Professional career

Philadlephia Eagles
Washington was selected by the Philadelphia Eagles in the sixth round (200th overall) of the 2012 NFL Draft. He signed a four-year contract with the team on May 11, 2012.

On August 31, 2012, the team released Washington as part of its final cuts.

Los Angeles Rams
After clearing waivers with the Eagles, Washington was signed to the Rams practice squad.

On December 31, 2012, Washington signed a two-year, $1,060,059 contract with the St. Louis Rams. He was waived on August 30, 2014.

Hamilton Tiger-Cats
On April 26, 2016, Washington signed as a free agent with the Hamilton Tiger-Cats of the Canadian Football League. He was released by the Tiger-Cats on June 14.

Toronto Argonauts
On September 19, 2016, Washington signed a practice roster agreement with the Toronto Argonauts of the Canadian Football League. On December 7, 2016, Washington re-signed with the Argonauts as a free agent. He played in 11 games with the team in 2017 and won a Grey Cup championship following the team's 105th Grey Cup victory. He played in seven games in 2018 before being released.

Massachusetts Pirates
On October 21, 2018, Washington signed with the Massachusetts Pirates of the National Arena League.

Coaching career
In January of 2020, Washington retired from playing, and joined the coaching staff at Florida Memorial as the offensive line coach.

In March of 2022, Washington was announced as a graduate assistant for the UCF Knights football program, working with the offensive line alongside offensive line coach Herb Hand.

References

External links
Toronto Argonauts bio
Philadelphia Eagles bio
Miami Hurricanes bio

1988 births
Living people
American football offensive guards
American football offensive tackles
Canadian football offensive linemen
American players of Canadian football
Miami Hurricanes football players
Philadelphia Eagles players
St. Louis Rams players
Hamilton Tiger-Cats players
Toronto Argonauts players
Players of American football from Miami
Miami Northwestern Senior High School alumni
Players of Canadian football from Miami